Pseudoplatystoma tigrinum, the tiger sorubim, tiger shovelnose or caparari is a species of long-whiskered catfish native to the Amazon Basin in South America.

Although most specimens are smaller than this.

References 

Pimelodidae
Fish of Bolivia
Freshwater fish of Brazil
Freshwater fish of Colombia
Freshwater fish of Ecuador
Fish of French Guiana
Freshwater fish of Peru
Fish of Venezuela
Fish of the Amazon basin
Fish described in 1840